Viktor Đerek (born March 8, 2000) is a Croatian photographer, based in Makarska, Croatia. His work includes nature, landscape, portrait and historiographical subjects.

In 2013, he collaborated on a short documentary film that was used in an advertising campaign for a tourist organization.

Biography

Early life and education

Viktor Đerek was born in Split on March 8, 2000. He has a younger brother Stjepan and younger sister Katarina. Đerek got involved in musical theatre at elementary school.

Work

Đerek gained an interest in photography at age 9 when he took a photography class. Afterward, he began travelling with his grandfather while taking photos independently and uploading them to the image hosting website Flickr. His love for photography was inspired by his grandfather.

In mid-2013, Đerek directed, produced and filmed his first short documentary film, Fairy Tale Croatia. The film includes footage of the city of Dubrovnik, Zadar, and Zagreb as well as footage of the National Park of Plitvice Lakes. Đerek has taken part in the pre-release promotion of the films Love, Simon and A Star is Born. A screening of Love, Simon was arranged in cooperation with  before its official release.

His photographs were published in a new historical novel by author , entitled Grački boj.

Short films
 Fairy Tale Croatia (2013)
 "Kako da Stanem?" (2014)

Exhibitions
 Zajedno (Together), Zagreb, 2008.

References

External links

Croatian photographers
Living people
2000 births
Artists from Split, Croatia